Derrick Kent Ramsey (born December 23, 1956) was the Kentucky Secretary of Education and Workforce Development, having been appointed by Governor Matt Bevin. He was the Deputy Secretary of Commerce under former Kentucky Governor Ernie Fletcher from 2003 to 2007. He is also a former professional American football player who played tight end for nine seasons for the Oakland/Los Angeles Raiders, New England Patriots, and Detroit Lions.

Ramsey grew up in Hastings, Florida and attended Hastings High School, where he won state championships in his first two years. He moved to live with an uncle in Camden, New Jersey and play for the Camden High School football team, which went 2-8 in his junior year and won the New Jersey state championship in his senior year.

Ramsey was a quarterback and tight end at the University of Kentucky, where he was part of the team that won the 1976 SEC Championship and the 1976 Peach Bowl.  He was first-team All SEC and third-team All-American as QB in 1977 when Kentucky finished with a 10-1 record and #6 ranking in the final AP poll.   Ramsey also played two games on the basketball team as a walk-on in 1976.  

He served as the Athletic Director at Coppin State University from 2008 to 2015.

He was appointed by Governor Matt Bevin to the board of trustee of University of Kentucky on July 25, 2017.

References

1956 births
Living people
American football tight ends
Oakland Raiders players
Los Angeles Raiders players
New England Patriots players
Detroit Lions players
Kentucky Wildcats football players
Coppin State Eagles athletic directors
American football quarterbacks
Players of American football from Florida
Players of American football from Camden, New Jersey
Camden High School (New Jersey) alumni
People from St. Johns County, Florida
State cabinet secretaries of Kentucky